Farnesyl pyrophosphate cyclase may refer to:
 5-epiaristolochene synthase, an enzyme
 (+)-epicubenol synthase, an enzyme